The 1951 San Diego State Aztecs football team represented San Diego State College during the 1951 college football season.

San Diego State competed in the California Collegiate Athletic Association (CCAA). The team was led by fifth-year head coach Bill Schutte, and played home games at both Aztec Bowl and Balboa Stadium. They finished the season undefeated, with ten wins, no losses and one tie (10–0–1, 4–0 CCAA). Overall, the team was dominant in nearly every game, outscoring its opponents 386–133 for the season.

At the end of the regular season, the Aztecs were invited to the Pineapple Bowl in Hawaii. On January 1, 1952, they defeated the Hawaii Rainbows, 34–13.

Schedule

Team players in the NFL
The following San Diego State players were selected in the 1952 NFL Draft.

Notes

References

San Diego State
San Diego State Aztecs football seasons
California Collegiate Athletic Association football champion seasons
Pineapple Bowl champion seasons
College football undefeated seasons
San Diego State Aztecs football